The Weeping Angels are a race of predatory creatures from the long-running science fiction series Doctor Who. They were introduced in the 2007 episode "Blink", making repeat appearances in later episodes. They also appeared in the spin-off series Class. Since their initial appearance, they have been persistently nominated as one of the most popular and frightening Doctor Who monsters. Steven Moffat attributes their appeal to childhood games such as Grandmother's Footsteps and the notion that every statue might secretly be a disguised Weeping Angel.

Description

In their usual form, Weeping Angels resemble silent human-sized stone statues in the form of winged angels in draped clothing, such as might appear as tomb statuary in a Victorian graveyard. As they close in on more aware victims they transform to a more horrific, bestial, and demonic aspect with wide-open mouths, vampiric teeth, and clawed hands. It is also implied that Weeping Angels can mimic the forms or dimensions of a broader range of statuary if required: in "The Angels Take Manhattan" (2012), one Weeping Angel takes the form (or hijacks the existing form) of the Statue of Liberty (manifesting as a full-size Liberty with Weeping Angel features) and the final moments of "Blink" (2007) suggest that any statue might be a disguised Weeping Angel.

In the episode "The Angels Take Manhattan", another form of Weeping Angel is shown, the cherubim. Unlike the Weeping Angels, the cherubim are not silent, making a childlike giggling and having audible footsteps. It is not explicitly stated that these are young Weeping Angels, but they are referred to as "the babies". 

When they are not being observed by another being, Weeping Angels can move very quickly and silently. Their phenomenal speed allows them to close distances of metres literally in the blink of an eye. However, when they are being observed they become "quantum-locked", occupying a single position in space and becoming stone. In this state, they are frozen and difficult to destroy.

Weeping Angels are physically very strong, although they rarely physically kill a victim since this wastes the time-potential energy which the Weeping Angels would otherwise consume. They prefer to take their energy from live victims, but if required, they can drain other forms such as that from electric lights or other electronics.

Weeping Angels have also exhibited a startling ability to project themselves through images. Using this ability, the Weeping Angels appear to manifest themselves from anything from videos to drawings. Weeping Angels can also imprint a mental image of themselves into a person's mind by usually looking straight into their eyes: the image then gestates and takes over the person's body to manifest as a new Weeping Angel.

Appearances

Doctor Who
 "Blink" (2007)
 "The Time of Angels" / "Flesh and Stone" (2010)
 "The Angels Take Manhattan" (2012)
 "Once, Upon Time" (2021)
 "Village of the Angels" (2021)

Cameos
 "The God Complex" (2011)
 "The Time of the Doctor" (2013)
 "Hell Bent" (2015)
 "Revolution of the Daleks" (2021)
 "The Halloween Apocalypse" (2021)
 "Survivors of the Flux" (2021)

Class
 "The Lost" (2016)

Novels
Touched by an Angel
Magic of the Angels
The Angel's Kiss
Ten Little Aliens

Short stories
"Living History"
"Suddenly in a Graveyard..."
"The Garden of Statues"

Audios
Fallen Angels
The Side of the Angels
Carnival of Angels
Out of Time 3: Wink

Video games
 Maze of the Dead (2011)
 Don't Blink! (2016)
 The Edge of Time (2019)
 The Lonely Assassins (2021)
 The Edge of Reality (2021)

Reception
In a poll conducted by the BBC, taking votes from 2,000 readers of the Doctor Who Adventures magazine, the Weeping Angels were voted the scariest monsters of 2007 with 55% of the vote; The Master and the Daleks took second and third place with 15% and 4% of the vote. The Daleks usually come out on top in such polls. Moray Laing, Editor of Doctor Who Adventures, praised the concept of escaping a monster by not blinking, something both simple and difficult to do. In a 2012 poll of over ten thousand respondents conducted by the Radio Times, the Weeping Angels were again voted the best Doctor Who monster with 49.4% of the vote. The Daleks came in second place with 17%.

The Weeping Angels came in at number three in Neil Gaiman's "Top Ten New Classic Monsters" in Entertainment Weekly. They were also rated the third "baddie" in Doctor Who by The Telegraph, behind the Nestene Consciousness and Daleks. The Angels were listed as the third scariest television characters by TV Squad. In 2009, SFX named the climax of "Blink" with the Weeping Angels advancing on Sally and Larry the scariest moment in Doctor Who history. They also listed the Angels in their list of favourite things of the revival of Doctor Who, writing, "Scariest. Monsters. Ever."

"Blink" won the Hugo Award for Best Dramatic Presentation, Short Form in 2008.

Popular culture
Weeping Angel is the name of a hacking tool revealed in Vault 7, co-developed by the CIA and MI5, used to exploit smart TVs for the purpose of covert intelligence gathering. Once installed in a suitable TV, the tool enables the television to record its surroundings while appearing to be turned off (so-called "Fake-Off"). The tool was developed in 2014 as part of a joint CIA/MI5 workshop, and there's no evidence that it was ever operational.

References

External links

Doctor Who races
Television characters introduced in 2007
Extraterrestrial supervillains
Fictional monsters